Daniel N. Klippenstein (September 30, 1939 – February 15, 1997) was a Canadian former curler. He played lead on the 1973 Brier Champion team (skipped by Harvey Mazinke), representing Saskatchewan. They later went on to win second place at the World Championships of that year.
He was inducted into the Saskatchewan Sports Hall of Fame in 1982. 

Klippenstein also played baseball until he was 55 years of age. He died from prostate cancer at the age of 57 in 1997. His grave site is at Trossachs, Saskatchewan. He worked as an Engineering Technician and Supervisor with Environment Canada.

References

External links

 Daniel Klippenstein — Curling Canada Stats Archive
 Video: 

Brier champions
1939 births
1997 deaths
Deaths from prostate cancer
Canadian male curlers
Curlers from Regina, Saskatchewan